Pruvotinidae is a diverse taxonomic family of cavibelonian solenogasters, shell-less, worm-like marine mollusks.

Genera
Subfamily Eleutheromeniinae Salvini-Plawen, 1978
 Eleutheromenia Salvini-Plawen, 1967
 Gephyroherpia Salvini-Plawen, 1978
 Luitfriedia Garcia-Álvarez & Urgorri, 2001
Subfamily Halomeniinae Salvini-Plawen, 1978
 Halomenia Heath, 1911
Subfamily Lophomeniinae Salvini-Plawen, 1978
 Forcepimenia Salvini-Plawen, 1969
 Hypomenia van Lummel, 1930
 Lophomenia Heath, 1911
 Metamenia Thiele, 1913
Subfamily Pruvotininae Heath, 1911
 Labidoherpia Salvini-Plawen, 1978
 Pararrhopalia Simroth, 1893
 Pruvotina Cockerell, 1903
Subfamily Scheltemaia incertae sedis
 Scheltemaia Salvini-Plawen, 2003
Subfamily Unciherpiinae Garcia-Álvarez, Salvini-Plawen & Urgorri, 2001
 Sialoherpia Salvini-Plawen, 1978
 Unciherpia Garcia-Álvarez, Salvini-Plawen & Urgorri, 2001
 Uncimenia Nierstrasz, 1903
Synonyms
 Subfamily Pararrhopaliinae Salvini-Plawen, 1978: synonym of Pruvotininae Heath, 1911
 Paramenia Pruvot, 1890: synonym of Pruvotina Cockerell, 1903 (invalid: junior homonym of Paramenia Brauer & Bergenstamm, 1889 [Diptera]; Pruvotina and Perimenia are replacement names )
 Perimenia Nierstrasz, 1908: synonym of Pruvotina Cockerell, 1903

References

 Simroth, H. (1893). Aplacophora. In: Bronn, H. G.: Die Klassen und Ordnungen des Thier-Reichs. 3 (1): 128–233, pl. 1–4.
  Nierstrasz, H. 1908. The Solenogastres of Discovery-Expedition. Nation. Antarctic Exped. 1901–1904, Natur. Hist., 4:38-46.
 Heath H. (1911). Reports on the scientific results of the expedition to the Tropical Pacific, in charge of Alexander Agassiz, by the U. S. Fish Commission Steamer Albatross, from August 1899 to June 1900, Commander Jefferson F. Moser. XVI. The Solenogastress. Memoirs of the Museum of Comparative Zoölogy at Harvard College 45: 1-182 pl. 1-40
 Salvini-Plawen, L.v. 1972. Zur Morphologie und Phylogenie der Mollusken: Die Beziehungen der Caudofoveata und der Solenogaster. Z. wiss. Zool., 184(3/4): 205-394
 García-Álvarez O., Salvini-Plawen L.v., Urgorri V. & Troncoso J.S. (2014). Mollusca. Solenogastres, Caudofoveata, Monoplacophora. Fauna Iberica. 38: 1-294

External links
 Salvini-Plawen, L.v. 2008. Contributions to West European Cavibelonia (Mollusca, Solenogastres)with two new species. Zoosystema, 30(4):873-897

Solenogastres